Tales of the Moonlight Cutter is a graphic novel series created by Dale Berry in the wu xia tradition. It is published through Berry's imprint, Myriad Publishing.

It tells the story of Shen Hua Yen, a man with a sword that can kill ghosts, taking them off the life-death wheel of karma. Shen travels throughout the world of 12th century China encountering supernatural adventure.

Publication history
The series, thus far, consists of four volumes.
Vol.#1: Debut. In which Shen Hua Yen battles a long-dead foe whose spirit has possessed an exorcist, and threatens a group of traveling players. Included in the Comic Buyer's Guide "A List".
Vol.#2: Silk & Spear. In which Shen Hua Yen, with unknown support from a Taoist sorcerer, battles an evil warrior armed with a legendary cursed weapon.
Vol.#3: Tears of the Dead. In which Shen Hua Yen investigates the haunting of a forbidden royal palace, where a ghost is murdering members of the Imperial court. Contains an accurate, complete Taoist exorcism ritual sequence.
Vol. #4: Hell's Summoner. In which Shen Hua Yen battles a vengeful clan intent on unleashing a vampire warrior. Guest stars the literary/historical figures Chan Cheng ("The Imperial Cat") and the 108 Heroes of the Water Margin.

References

Horror graphic novels
Fantasy graphic novels
Adventure graphic novels